James J. Daly (January 6, 1865 – April 30, 1938) was a Major League Baseball player in 1892. He started the year in the Eastern League and was acquired by the Baltimore Orioles late in the season. He played in various minor leagues from 1888 to 1897.

Daly was nicknamed ″Sun″ because he did not wear sunglasses while playing the outfield.

References

External links
 Baseball-Reference.com page

1865 births
1938 deaths
19th-century baseball players
Baltimore Orioles (NL) players
Baseball players from New York (state)
Major League Baseball outfielders
Rochester Browns players
Lebanon Cedars players